Amelia Toomey (born 6 December 1997), known professionally as Girli, is an English singer and songwriter. Based in London, she has released a number of singles and three EPs. The Guardian has described her sound as veering "between PC Music, bubblegum pop, pop punk and rap, each one treading a line between catchy and deliberately discomforting." Much of her music is about feminism, sexuality, queer culture, and mental health. 

In April 2019, Girli released her debut studio album, Odd One Out, on PMR Records. After being dropped by her record label and later being forced to cancel her 2020 Sofa Tour due to the COVID-19 pandemic, Girli released the EP Ex Talk in 2021. She is currently with independent label AllPoints.

Early life
Girli is from northwest London. She was born on 6 December 1997 to acting parents, and is half-Australian. She has a younger sister. As a child she wanted to be an actor, but abandoned her ambition after 2 unsuccessful auditions. She wrote her first song aged 8, about a boy in her class at school who she liked.

She attended Hampstead School, a comprehensive secondary school in Cricklewood. Girli describes her experience of secondary school as "the worst five years of my life, it was so bad", experiencing bullying that "made me quite an anxious person". She was nonetheless active in extracurricular activities, getting elected as a Deputy Young MP for Camden in 2012 and spending lunchtimes in the music room playing instruments.

Career
Girli realised that she wanted to be a musician aged 14 after feeling inspired at a Tegan and Sara concert. She started her career doing open mics under her legal name, Milly Toomey. She later formed indie rock band Ask Martin with older girls she met online, performing vocals and guitar. After her bandmates went away to university, Girli started performing solo.

Girli attended the East London Arts & Music college in Bromley-by-Bow from 2014 to 2016. During that period she developed interests in beatmaking, rap, and drum and bass, and made her musical debut as Girli. She released her first single, "So You Think You Can Fuck With Me Do Ya?" in 2015, aged 17. She was signed by PMR Records in October 2015.

In 2016, Girli toured the UK throughout September and October supporting musician Oscar.

In 2017, Girli released the Feel OK EP, supported Declan McKenna around the UK and performed at Latitude Festival. She also had a headline UK tour, titled "Hot Mess", in support of an EP of the same name which was released in October 2017 and showed elements of pop punk.

In 2018, Girli performed at the MTV Presents Gibraltar Calling festival. In 2019, she released the single "Deal With It" and released her debut studio album, Odd One Out, 4 years after her debut single. In July 2019, Girli released the single “Up & Down”. Later in 2019, Girli was dropped by her record label. She wrote her subsequent single "Has Been" in response, stating on Instagram, “This song is for my ex record label who didn't think I was perfect or pop star enough to sell records." Girli was due to take her Sofa Tour around the UK in March 2020, but cancelled the dates due to the COVID-19 pandemic. Her first EP on the independent record label AllPoints, Ex Talk, was released in February 2021. 

Girli previously performed on stage with DJ Kitty (Rosalie Sylvia Fountain), who provided backing vocals. DJ Kitty was later replaced by DJ GG, after DJ Kitty resigned due to other commitments.

Artistry

Influences 
Girli has cited a diverse range of influences including Tove Lo, the Arctic Monkeys, Lily Allen, The Slits, M.I.A, Spice Girls, PC music, and Kyary Pamyu Pamyu. Discussing the inspiration behind her stage name, she cited the rock band Blondie, saying she wanted "a name that embodied a female pop star". She has also mentioned her home city of London, particularly its nightlife, as a major influence on her sound and lyrics.

Style 
Girli's music makes use of samples from various sources including video games and news broadcasts.

Girli has stated that her songs are all autobiographical. Referring to her most recent EP, Ex Talk, Girli said, "I think this era of Girli, my style is definitely more influenced by '90s grunge and '70s punk, kind of mixed in together in a modern way."

Image 
While performing in indie band Ask Martin as Milly Toomey in her mid-teens, Girli had short brown hair and wore men's clothing. As Girli, she has a distinctive visual aesthetic that includes neon pink dyed hair. Girli has observed a close link between her music and her fashion style. Describing her transition into a pink aesthetic, she said "I was really into indie, then I started listening to more female-made music, and my style developed based on what I was listening to." In a 2018 interview she described "wearing way more non-pink items of clothing, black, tartan and fishnet tights" when performing songs with a "more alternative and rockier sound".

Girli has named Harajuku street fashion, the 1990s riot grrrl scene, and noughties girl bands as fashion influences. 

Another core part of Girli's public persona is her feminist beliefs. Early interviews describe Girli throwing tampons into the crowd at gigs, which she said was a way of challenging the societal taboo around menstruation. Girli has expressed the view that music is a way to effect political change, in a way she views as more effective than parliamentary politics, which she became disillusioned with after her time as a Youth MP. She announced a partnership with Girls Against, an organisation campaigning against sexual harassment in live music venues, in 2016.

She took part in stylist Louby McLoughlin's project OKgrl, a fashion and music platform, in 2017, and Kirsti-Nicole Hadley's GRL PWR, a female-only arts collective.

Personal life 
Girli is openly bisexual/queer. She first came out as bisexual aged 15 at a Tegan and Sara concert. She also uses the word pansexual to describe herself. Commenting on gender identity in a 2017 interview, she said : "Right now I identify as a woman, but what does that even mean? Is that what I say, who I am? Right now I feel like a woman, but that may change. Some days, I'm like 'fuck it, I don't feel like a woman or a man.'"

She has stated that she suffers from obsessive-compulsive disorder and takes antidepressants. Her single "Up & Down" is about her mental health struggles. She is a skateboarder.

Discography

Albums

Extended plays

Singles

As lead artist

As featured artist

References

External links

1997 births
Living people
English women pop singers
English record producers
English women rappers
English people of Australian descent
British people of English descent
British people of Australian descent
Feminist musicians
British women record producers
British LGBT singers
Rappers from London
LGBT rappers
Bisexual musicians
Bisexual women
Queer musicians
Queer women
People with obsessive–compulsive disorder
20th-century LGBT people
21st-century LGBT people